The Bees Act 1980 (c. 12) is an Act of the Parliament of the United Kingdom.

Powers
If the Minister of Agriculture, Fisheries and Food (post now replaced by the Secretary of State for Environment, Food and Rural Affairs), the Secretary of State for Scotland and the Secretary of State for Wales all agree and decide jointly that a threat is posed to the health of bees, they may prohibit the transportation into or around the United Kingdom of bees, honeycomb, beehives or anything connected with beekeeping. They may appoint any person (in writing) they choose to seize and examine bees for disease.

Any bees found to be diseased may be destroyed if the inspector sees fit. Bees or related equipment imported into Britain may also be destroyed at the discretion of government officials. No compensation is available for those whose bees are destroyed. Any expenses incurred during this process were to be compensated by Parliament.

Power of forced entry was also given to officials who suspect diseased bees to be on the premises ("any premises or other place, or any vessel, boat, hovercraft, aircraft or other vehicle").

Offences
It was made an offence to transport bees into or around Britain while the Act was in force - either by importing them, or by failing to cooperate with government orders. A maximum fine of £1,000 was introduced for committing this offence.

Any person who refused government officials entry to any premises or other place, or any vessel, boat, hovercraft, aircraft or other vehicle which was suspected to harbour diseased bees was to be charged with obstruction of justice and fined up to £200.

Application
The Act does not extend to Northern Ireland.

Powers under this act are now devolved to the Welsh Assembly, under The National Assembly for Wales (Transfer of Functions) Order 2004.

See also
Beekeeping in the United Kingdom

References

External links

1980 in British law
United Kingdom Acts of Parliament 1980
Acts of the Parliament of the United Kingdom concerning England and Wales
Legal history of England
Beekeeping in the United Kingdom
Agriculture legislation in the United Kingdom
Acts of the Parliament of the United Kingdom concerning Scotland